The Home Counties Division was an infantry division of the Territorial Force, part of the British Army, that was raised in 1908. As the name suggests, the division recruited in the Home Counties, particularly Kent, Middlesex, Surrey and Sussex.

At the outbreak of the First World War, it accepted liability for overseas service and was posted to India in 1914 to relieve Regular Army units for service on the Western Front. On arrival in India it was effectively broken up, so it did not see active service as a complete formation. However, most of its constituent units did serve in active theatres, notably Mesopotamia from 1915 and in the Third Anglo-Afghan War in 1919.

Reformed in the Territorial Army (TA) in 1920 as the 44th (Home Counties) Division, the division saw active service in the Second World War in Belgium, France and North Africa (notably in the Battle of El Alamein) before again being disbanded in 1943. Once again, its component units continued to serve, in North Africa, Italy, North-West Europe, and Burma.

The division was again reformed in the TA in 1947 before being merged with the Home Counties District in 1961, thus ending its separate existence.

History

Formation
The Territorial Force (TF) was formed on 1 April 1908 following the enactment of the Territorial and Reserve Forces Act 1907 (7 Edw.7, c.9) which combined and re-organised the old Volunteer Force, the Honourable Artillery Company and the Yeomanry.  On formation, the TF contained 14 infantry divisions and 14 mounted yeomanry brigades.  One of the divisions was the Home Counties Division.

As the name suggests, the division recruited in the Home Counties, particularly Kent, Middlesex, Surrey and Sussex.  It was composed of the Surrey, Middlesex and Kent Infantry Brigades (each of four battalions), four artillery brigades of the Royal Field Artillery recruited in Sussex and Kent, a heavy battery of the Royal Garrison Artillery (also recruited in Kent), plus support units of the Royal Engineers (including the Signal Service), Royal Army Medical Corps and the Army Service Corps.  Two Army Troops battalions of the Royal Sussex Regiment were also attached for training, but were not integral to the division.  In peacetime, the divisional headquarters was in Hounslow in Middlesex.

First World War
In accordance with the Territorial and Reserve Forces Act 1907 (7 Edw.7, c.9) which brought the Territorial Force into being, the TF was intended to be a home defence force for service during wartime and members could not be compelled to serve outside the country. However, on the outbreak of war on 4 August 1914, many members volunteered for Imperial Service.  Therefore, TF units were split into 1st Line (liable for overseas service) and 2nd Line (home service for those unable or unwilling to serve overseas) units.  2nd Line units performed the home defence role, although in fact most of these were also posted abroad in due course.  The Home Counties Division formed the 2nd Home Counties Division in this manner with an identical structure.

The division mobilised on the outbreak of the war.  Early in September 1914, the division sent two battalions to Gibraltar to relieve regular battalions; 7th and 8th Middlesex left on 4 and 10 September respectively.  On 22 September, India agreed to send 32 British and 20 Indian regular battalions to Europe in exchange for 43 partially trained TF battalions.  Accordingly, the division accepted liability for service in India.  It was joined by the 4th (Cumberland and Westmorland) Battalion, Border Regiment (from Carlisle) and the 4th Battalion, King's (Shropshire Light Infantry) (from Shrewsbury) to replace 7th and 8th Middlesex, and 1/1st Brecknockshire Battalion, South Wales Borderers (from Brecon) as an extra battalion for garrison duties in Aden.

The division sailed from Southampton on 30 October 1914 with 13 infantry battalions and 3 artillery brigades (nine batteries of four 15-pounder BLCs each, but without ammunition columns).  The infantry brigade staffs, the IV Home Counties (H) Brigade, RFA, the Home Counties (Kent) Heavy Battery, the engineers, signals, ambulance and train units were all left behind and most were soon posted to other divisions on the Western Front.

The division arrived at Bombay on 1–3 December 1914, with the Brecknockshire Battalion departing again on 9 December for Aden.  The divisional commander, Major-General J.C. Young, accompanied the division to India.  On arrival, he handed over the units and returned to England, arriving on 22 December.  He took command of the 2nd Line 2nd Home Counties Division on 20 January 1915.

The division was effectively broken up on arrival in India in December 1914; the units reverted to peacetime conditions and were dispersed throughout India and Burma.  The battalions were posted to Lucknow (2), Cawnpore, Fyzabad, Mhow, Kamptee, Jubbulpore, Jhansi, Dinapore, Fort William, Rangoon and Maymyo and the batteries were posted to Kamptee, Mhow (2), Jullundur, Multan, Ferozepore, and Jubbulpore (3).  The battalions and batteries moved around the various garrison stations in India, Burma and Aden from time to time.  For example, the 1/4th Buffs moved from Mhow to Aden in August 1915, to Bareilly in January 1916, and to Multan in July 1918 where it remained until the end of the war.  The 1/4th KSLI went further afield; on arrival in India, it was posted to Rangoon, with a detachment in the Andaman Islands.  On 6 February 1915 it was dispatched to Singapore to help to suppress a mutiny.  In April, part of the battalion went to Hong Kong; the battalion was replaced at Rangoon by the 2/4th Border Regiment.  Thereafter, it returned to England via Colombo, Durban and Cape Town before landing at Plymouth on 27 July 1917.  Two days later, it left Southampton for France to join 63rd (Royal Naval) Division.

The units pushed on with training to prepare for active service, handicapped by the need to provide experienced manpower for active service units.  By early 1916 it had become obvious that it would not be possible to transfer the division to the Western Front as originally intended.  Nevertheless, individual units of the division proceeded overseas on active service through the rest of the war.  All three artillery brigades went to Mesopotamia in 1916 (III Home Counties) and 1917 (I and II Home Counties) and, likewise, so did 1/5th Queen's, 1/5th Buffs, 1/5th East Surrey, 1/9th Middlesex, 1/5th QORWK infantry battalions. In addition, the 1/4th Queen's, the 1/4th and 2/4th Border, and the 1/4th QORWK took part in the Third Anglo-Afghan War in 1919.

The Territorial Force divisions and brigades were numbered in May 1915 in the order that they departed for overseas service, starting with the 42nd (East Lancashire) Division.  The Home Counties Division should have been numbered as the 44th (Home Counties) Division, but as the division had already been broken up, this was merely a place holder.  Likewise, the Surrey, Middlesex and Kent Brigades were only notionally numbered as 131st, 132nd and 133rd, respectively.

Between the wars
In 1919, the remaining units in India were repatriated to England. The Territorial Force was effectively disbanded in 1919, but started to reform from 1 February 1920 as the units commenced recruiting.  From 1 October 1921, it was renamed as the Territorial Army (TA).  The division was reformed in 1920.

One major change with the new TA had an effect on the number of infantry battalions.  The original 14 divisions were reformed with the pre-war standard of three brigades of four battalions each, for a total of 168 battalions.  Infantry were no longer to be included as Army Troops or part of the Coastal Defence Forces so the pre-war total of 208 battalions had to be reduced by 40.  This was achieved by either converting certain battalions to other roles, usually artillery or engineers, or by amalgamating pairs of battalions within a regiment.  The 44th (Home Counties) Division illustrated both of these processes: the 10th Battalion, Middlesex Regiment was converted to the Home Counties Divisional Signals, RCS in 1921 and the 4th and 5th (The Weald of Kent) Battalions, Buffs were amalgamated as the 4th/5th Battalion in the same year.  In this way, the division was able to incorporate two Army Troops battalions of the Royal Sussex Regiment.

The divisional artillery was reformed with three brigades: 1st Home Counties with 1–4 Sussex Batteries, 2nd Home Counties with 5–8 Sussex Batteries, and 3rd Home Counties with 1–4 Kent Batteries.  These were renumbered in 1921 as the 57th (Home Counties), 58th (Home Counties) and 59th (Home Counties) Brigades, later 57th (Home Counties), 58th (Sussex) and 59th (Home Counties)(Cinque Ports) Brigades.

The division underwent a number of changes in the late 1930s.  In 1936, it was decided to concentrate Vickers machine guns in specialised machine gun battalions.  Rather than resurrecting the Machine Gun Corps, a number of line infantry regiments were converted instead; the Middlesex Regiment was one of four regiments selected for conversion.  The 7th and 8th Battalions were converted at the same time.  They were replaced by the 22nd and 24th Battalions of the London Regiment, which from 1937 became the 6th (Bermondsey) and 7th (Southwark) Battalions of the Queen's Royal Regiment (West Surrey).

A major reorganisation in 1938 saw the TA divisions reduced from twelve to nine battalions.  As a result, 9th Middlesex was converted to 60th (Middlesex) Searchlight Regiment, RA, the 4th Queen's to 63rd (Queen's) Searchlight Regiment, RA and 5th East Surreys to 57th (East Surrey) Anti-Tank Regiment, RA  The latter remained part of the division.  In the same year, the 59th (Home Counties)(Cinque Ports) Field Regiment, RA was converted to 75th (Home Counties)(Cinque Ports) Anti-Aircraft Regiment, RA.  It was replaced by 65th (8th London) Field Regiment, RA from the former 47th (2nd London) Division.

By 1939 it became clear that a new European war was likely to break out, and the doubling of the Territorial Army was authorised, with each unit and formation forming a duplicate.  The 44th (Home Counties) Division formed the 12th (Eastern) Infantry Division.

Second World War
The division, as the 44th (Home Counties) Infantry Division (Major-General Edmund Osborne), was mobilised on 3 September 1939 on the outbreak of the Second World War. Initially in Southern and then Eastern Command, the division was sent overseas where it joined the British Expeditionary Force (BEF) in France on 1 April 1940 and was assigned to III Corps (Lieutenant-General Ronald Forbes Adam). It took part in the Battle of St Omer-La Bassée (2329 May) during the retreat to Dunkirk. At the end of May 1940 the division was evacuated from at Dunkirk after the German Army threatened to cut off and destroy the entire BEF from the French Army during the battles of France and Belgium.

After returning to England the division, much reduced in manpower and woefully short of equipment and now under the command of Major-General Arthur Percival (who had taken command in late June 1940, until late March the following year), spent nearly two years on home defence, anticipating a German invasion which never occurred, travelling through the counties of Kent and Sussex and serving under I and XII Corps. On 29 May 1942, the division, now under the control of the War Office and commanded by Major-General Ivor Hughes, departed the United Kingdom to take part in the North African Campaign. It arrived in Cairo, Egypt on 24 Julythe long journey being due to sailing via the Cape of Good Hope.

Less than three weeks after its arrival the division was ordered by General Sir Harold Alexander (replacing General Sir Claude Auchinleck on 13 August), the Commander-in-Chief (C-in-C), Middle East, to be sent forward to join the Eighth Army (Lieutenant General Bernard Montgomery), at El Alamein. The 44th Division joined XIII Corps (Lieutenant-General Brian Horrocks, commander of the division between June 1941 and March 1942) and fought at the Battle of Alam el Halfa (30 August – 7 September) where the 132nd Brigade was temporarily detached to the 2nd New Zealand Division and suffered nearly 700 casualties.

On 8 September, the 133rd Brigade was detached from the division. It was briefly assigned to the 8th Armoured Division before being transferred to the 10th Armoured Division on 29 September as a lorried infantry unit. The division started the Second Battle of El Alamein (23 October – 4 November) with two brigades. It was still in XIII Corps, with the 7th Armoured Division and 50th (Northumbrian) Infantry Division. The corps was on the southern flank with the task of tying down Axis reserves while the main thrust was made in the north by XXX and X Corps. The division was further reduced when the 131st Brigade was attached to the 7th Armoured Division on 1 November, as a lorried infantry brigade after the 7th Motor Brigade was transferred to the 1st Armoured Division.

The Battle of El Alamein was the last engagement of the 44th Division; it was disbanded on 31 January 1943. The 132nd and 133rd Brigade were dispersed, with the battalions ending up as British battalions in British Indian Army brigades. The 131st Brigade remained in the 7th Armoured Division for the rest of the war, taking part in the rest of the North African Campaign, culminating in May 1943 with the surrender of almost 250,000 Axis soldiers as prisoners of war, the Allied invasion of Italy from September–November 1943 and in the North-West Europe campaign from June 1944 until Victory in Europe Day in May 1945.

Post Second World War
The Territorial Army (TA) was formally disbanded at the end of the Second World War. TA units were reactivated on 1 January 1947, though no personnel were assigned until commanding officers and permanent staff had been appointed in March and April 1947. The division, under the command of Major-General Philip Gregson-Ellis, was reformed in 1947; it included the Northamptonshire Yeomanry, and 47th (London), 131st (Surrey), and 133rd (Kent & Sussex) Infantry Brigades.

On 1 May 1961, all ten TA divisions were merged with the districts, and the division became 44th (Home Counties) Division/District, thus ending the division's separate existence. Subsequently, redesignated as South Eastern District, it was used to form the 4th Division on 1 April 1995.

Orders of battle

Commanders
The Home Counties Division had the following commanders, from formation in April 1908 to disembarkation in India:

When the division was re-established after the First World War, it had the following commanders until it was disbanded in the Middle East on 31 January 1943:

When the division was re-established after the Second World War, it had the following commanders until 1 May 1961 when the Territorial Army divisional headquarters were merged with regular army districts:

See also

 67th (2nd Home Counties) Division for the 2nd Line formation in the First World War
 12th (Eastern) Division for the duplicate formation in the Second World War
 List of British divisions in World War I
 List of British divisions in World War II
 British Army Order of Battle (September 1939)
 Second Battle of El Alamein order of battle

Notes

References

Bibliography
 
 
 
 
 
 
 
 
 
 
 Col L.F. Morling, Sussex Sappers: A History of the Sussex Volunteer and Territorial Army Royal Engineer Units from 1890 to 1967, Seaford: 208th Field Co, RE/Christians–W. J. Offord, 1972.

External links
 
 
 

Infantry divisions of the British Army in World War I
Infantry divisions of the British Army in World War II
Military units and formations established in 1908
Military units and formations disestablished in 1914
Military units and formations established in 1920
Military units and formations disestablished in 1943
Military units and formations established in 1947
Military units and formations disestablished in 1961
1908 establishments in the United Kingdom
Home counties